Wilpena  may refer to:

 Wilpena Pound,  geological feature in South Australia
 Wilpena Station, a former pastoral lease  in South Australia
 Wilpena Island - refer List of islands within the Murray River in South Australia

See also

Wilpena Pound Airport - refer List of airports by IATA code: H